Euproctis fraterna is a moth of the family Erebidae first described by Frederic Moore in 1883. It is found in the Maldives, India, Sri Lanka and the Seychelles.

Description
The adult is yellowish with pale transverse lines and black spots on the forewing. Larvae are hairy and reddish brown. Head reddish with white hairs.

The caterpillar is major pest on several agricultural crops such as Ziziphus mauritiana, Ziziphus xylopyra, Ziziphus jujuba, Terminalia cattappa, Ricinus communis, Pyrus communis, Quisqualis indica, Sesamum indicum, Shorea robusta, Solanum melongena, Tectona grandis, Rosa, Rubus, Toxicodendron succedaneum, Trewia nudiflora, Tylophora asthmatica, Vigna unguiculata, Punica granatum, Codiaeum, Coffea, Dalbergia sissoo, Desmodium oojeinense, Gossypium, Grewia asiatica, Helianthus annuus, Hibiscus rosa-sinensis, Limonia elephantum, Malus pumila, Mangifera indica, Manihot esculenta, Manilkara zapota, Musa, Pelargonium, Persea bombycina, Plantago, Prunus persica, Psidium, Punica granatum, Abelmoschus esculentus, Aleurites fordii, Aleurites montana, Artocarpus heterophyllus, Bauhinia variegate, Bombax, Cajanus cajan, Camellia sinensis, Cinnamomum and Citrus.

The first sign of the attack is defoliation. Caterpillars can be controlled by the spraying of neem oil or chlorpyrifos and quinolphos. Caterpillars can also be controlled by mechanical methods or biological predators such as the parasitoids Helicospilus merdarius, Helicospilus horsefieldi, Apanteles species, Disophrys species.

References

External links
Chemical control of hairy caterpillar, Euproctis fraterna Moore, on jujube (Ziziphus mauritiana Lamk.) 1972
Biology and control of hairy caterpillar, Euproctis fraterna Moore on jujube
Bionomics of Euproctis fraterna Moore (Lepidoptera: Lymantriidae) on Ziziphus xylopyra Willd.
Euproctis fraterna The Pherobase
Effect of Azadirachta indica and Pongamia glabra leaf extracts on food utilization and modulation of efficiency of digestive enzymes in Euproctis fraternal

Moths of Asia
Moths described in 1883